Kheewa is a village situated alongside Jalalpur–Gujrat road in the district of Gujrat, Pakistan.

References

Villages in Gujrat District